Plectrohyla exquisita is a species of frogs in the family Hylidae. Before its description in 1998, it was confused with Plectrohyla teuchestes. It is endemic to the Sierra de Omoa in the Cortés Department of northwestern Honduras. The species range is within the Cusuco National Park.

Natural habitats of Plectrohyla exquisita are lower montane wet forests at elevations of  asl. They are found on low vegetation along streams and breed in streams. It is moderately common but assumed to be in decline because of chytridiomycosis.

References

exquisita
Endemic fauna of Honduras
Amphibians of Honduras
Frogs of North America
Critically endangered fauna of North America
Amphibians described in 1998
Taxonomy articles created by Polbot